Fogli is an Italian surname. Notable people with the surname include:

Andrea Fogli, Italian interior designer
Laura Fogli (born 1959), Italian long-distance runner
Riccardo Fogli (born 1947), Italian singer
Romano Fogli (born 1938), Italian footballer and manager

Italian-language surnames